Point Cires is a promontory and two islands off the northern coast of Morocco within the Strait of Gibraltar. It is near the Mediterranean port of Tanger-Med within the Tanger-Tetouan-Al Hoceima region of northern Morocco.

Perejil Island, a disputed territory between Morocco and Spain, is about  East.

References

Islands of Morocco
Strait of Gibraltar
Geography of Tanger-Tetouan-Al Hoceima
Uninhabited islands